Afzal Ahmed Khan is an Indian film director and producer.

Early life

Afzal Ahmed Khan is a graduate from Aligarh Muslim University who was born and brought up in a literary environment. His major influences came from his grandfather, who he was very close to. Afzal had always dream of making it big in Bollywood since the age of 5 years. Though, no one in his family believed him then. It was only after his graduation that his family members took him seriously.

Initial Struggle

Afzal Ahmed Khan reached Mumbai – the city of dreams and landed at Dilip Kumar's bungalow. Kumar's brother Ehsaan Khan mentored Afzal Ahmed Khan during his initial struggle period. Afzal stayed with Ehsaan Khan for a year, and it was during this period that Afzal was introduced to many celebrated filmmakers (K. Asif was one of them) and got trained in all departments of film-making.

Film career

Afzal Ahmed Khan was introduced to Sultan Ahmed by K. Asif with whom he started his career. Afzal Ahmed Khan assisted Sultan Ahmed on his 1984 release – Daata. Later on, he went on to assist filmmaker Chandra Barot of Don fame on his still unreleased film – Boss starring Vinod Khanna and Jaya Prada. Afzal Ahmed Khan was also the associate director of Sultan Ahmed's 1990 release Jai Vikranta.
 
Afzal Ahmed Khan turned writer with Akshay Kumar’s 1991 film Dancer. But his big break as a director came in the form of Ekka Raja Rani starring Govinda, Vinod Khanna, Ayesha Jhulka in the year 1994. He was also the writer of the film and it did good business at the box office. In the year 2005, Afzal Ahmed Khan was back to his first love – cinema. He directed Mashooka starring Meghna Naidu, Vidya Malavade, Aditya Bal.
 
Since 2010, Afzal Ahmed Khan has been working on his most ambitious animated projects – The Adventures of Sinbad and Hatim Tai. Afzal Ahmed Khan owns a recording/editing/animation studio in the heart of Mumbai called Lodi Studios.

Television career

After movies, it was the turn of television and Afzal Ahmed Khan also debuted as a television producer/director for Daastan-e-Hatimtai in 1995 on Doordarshan, starring Shammi Kapoor in his television debut. It was one of the most expensive shows and also registered high TRPs. He has also worked on TV serials like Doordarshan’s Bhabhi Maa, Zee TV’s horror show X Zone and Rishtey which introduced Juhi Parmar and NDTV Imagine’s Chutti Time as a director/producer.

Advertising career

Afzal Ahmed Khan has also created several memorable TV commercials for brands like Raymond, Hindustan Petroleum, Shipping Corporation, LIC, Visa since 1996. Afzal has been awarded with numerous awards at various ad film festivals. Afzal Ahmed Khan is the creative brain behind public interest ads like ‘Jaago Grahak Jaago’ on Doordarshan.

Producer

 Daastan-e-Hatimtai – TV Series (1995)
 Bhabhi Maa – TV Series
 X Zone – TV Series
 Rishtey
 Chutti Time
 The Adventure of Sinbad (2013)
 Hatim Tai (2013)

Director

 Ekka Raja Rani (1994)
 Daastan-e-Hatimtai – TV Series (1995)
 Bhabhi Maa – TV Series
 X Zone – TV Series
 Rishtey – TV Series
 Chutti Time – TV Series
 Mashooka (2005)

Writer

 Dancer (1991)
 Ekka Raja Rani (1994)

References

External links
 

Indian television directors
Living people
Year of birth missing (living people)
Aligarh Muslim University alumni
Indian television producers
Hindi-language film directors
Indian animated film directors
Indian animated film producers